Velvet Music is a Russian record label and production company established in February 2004 by Alyona Mikhailova and Liana Meladze.

Artists 
 Mari Kraimbrery
 Yolka / ЯАVЬ
 Vintage
 Banev!
 
 DAASHA
 CeloFan
 Vladimir Presnyakov
 Gosha Kutsenko
 Feigin
 Nikita Kiosse
 Nasty Ash

References

External references 
 Official website
 Catalog at Discogs

Russian record labels
Record labels established in 2004
Companies based in Moscow
Russian brands